

Chart history

External links
British Video Association
The Official Charts Company (OCC)

2003 record charts
2003 in British cinema